The following elections occurred in the year 1814.

North America

United States
 United States House of Representatives elections in New York, 1814
 1814 and 1815 United States House of Representatives elections
 1814 and 1815 United States Senate elections

See also
 :Category:1814 elections

1814
Elections